KIKI (990 AM, "Fox Sports 990") is a sports radio station licensed to Honolulu, Hawaii, and owned by .  Its studios and transmitter are separately located in the Kalihi neighborhood of Honolulu.

History
The station signed on the air as KHVH in 1957 by then-owner Kaiser Broadcasting, who would later sell the station in 1965.

In 1993, KHVH swapped frequencies with Oldies station KIKI, then at 830 kHz. KIKI at 990 would drop oldies for news in 1994, followed by a flip to country music from 1997 to 1999, a simulcast of KHJZ from 1999 to 2001, and a flip to business news in 2001 as KHBZ, only to evolve into its talk radio format by 2004. In 2008 KHBZ changed its slogan from "The Talk Station" to "Stimulating Talk Radio" On September 2, 2010, KHBZ took possession of the KIKI calls after the FM flipped formats from Rhythmic Top 40 to Rhythmic AC (as KHJZ), bringing the KIKI calls back to 990.

On March 18, 2016, KIKI changed their format from talk to sports, branded as "Fox Sports 990".

Previous logo
 Similar to sister station KFI

References

External links
FCC History Cards for KIKI
Fox Sports 990 official website

IKI
Sports radio stations in the United States
Kaiser Broadcasting
Radio stations established in 1957
1957 establishments in Hawaii
IHeartMedia radio stations